The Canadian federal budget for fiscal year 1975-1976 was presented by Minister of Finance John Turner in the House of Commons of Canada on 23 June 1975.

External links 

 Budget Speech
 Budget in Brief

References

Canadian budgets
1975 in Canadian law
1975 government budgets
1975 in Canadian politics